Chih-Ling Tsai is an American business management professor and author, currently a Distinguished Professor and Robert W. Glock Endowed Chair in Management, at University of California, Davis, and has been both cited and collected by libraries. He is a Fellow of the International Statistical Institute, American Association for the Advancement of Science and American Statistical Association and has also been included in the Who's Who in the America, Who's Who in the World and Who's Who in the West and Who's Who in Science and Engineering. In 2012, he also held the Distinguished Visiting Professorship at National Taiwan University.

Bibliography

References

External links

American business writers
American economists
21st-century Taiwanese economists
University of California, Davis faculty
Academic staff of the National Taiwan University
University of Texas at Austin faculty
New York University faculty
Fellows of the American Statistical Association
Fellows of the American Association for the Advancement of Science
Elected Members of the International Statistical Institute
Academic staff of Peking University
Year of birth missing (living people)
Living people